Biikzhal (Biıkjal, بيىكجال) is an abandoned town in Atyrau Region, southwest Kazakhstan.

References

Atyrau Region
Cities and towns in Kazakhstan